The Opaskwayak Cree Nation (OCN,) is a First Nations band government located in Manitoba, Canada. The main OCN reserve is regarded as one of three distinct communities that comprise "The Pas area" in northern Manitoba, with the two others being the Town of The Pas and the Rural Municipality of Kelsey.

Most of the OCN's on-reserve population lives near the Town of The Pas on the OCN 21E reserve, but the band also has many other reserves stretching from Goose Lake in the north to Mountain Cabin, Saskatchewan, in the south. OCN is accessible by rail, road, water, and air travel.

Peoples of the OCN are Swampy Cree, and their dominant language is from the Swampy Cree n-dialect. The Opaskwayak people first negotiated and entered into Treaty 5 in 1876.

The First Nation hosts the Opaskwayak Indian Days annually each August.

History 
When the Opaskwayak people signed Treaty 5 on in 1876, the federal government agreed to give the band Timber Rights. In 1904, the band opened a sawmill on Mission Island in the Saskatchewan River. Soon after, the band surrendered their land on the south side of the river, and in 1908, they moved their sawmill to the north side. The sawmill operated intermittently until 1930, and provided wood for most of the homes built in the first few decades of the 20th century.

According to oral traditions, Cree peoples have occupied the landscape of north-central Manitoba since time immemorial; this claim has been supported by archaeology. The earliest archeological evidence of the people occupying the area has been carbon dated 2,600–4,000 years ago.

The current townsite of Opaskwayak, reserve parcel 21E, was a historical gathering place where people travelled for spiritual healing. The area Cree would meet here every summer to fish, harvest, and cultivate the land.

The language of the Opaskwayak people is from the Swampy Cree n-dialect. There was a number of local bands who shared the same defined territory which, in turn, composed of a number of interrelated families who came together periodically through the year for various social, cultural activities and ceremonies.

MacKay Indian Residential School 

Opening for classes in October 1914, the school was named the MacKay Indian Residential School in commemoration of Anglican archdeacon John Alexander Mackay of Saskatchewan. In its first year, the school had  81 pupils. As the land was largely unsuitable for farming, the school only had a vegetable garden to grow food for students.

The school was administered by the Bishop and Diocese of Saskatchewan until January 1922, when it was transferred to the Missionary Society of the Church of England in Canada. It was destroyed by fire on March 19, 1933, and was not rebuilt. Many of the displaced students were sent to the Elkhorn and Lake La Ronge schools. Another residential school of the same name operated at Dauphin from 1955 to 1980.

The former school site is now used for community events.

Development, education, and recreation 
OCN is also home to an indoor ice hockey arena called the Gordon Lathlin Memorial Centre, named after former Chief Gordon William Lathlin (1933-1976), who is credited for expanding the band’s economic base, establishing several successful businesses, and supervising the construction of a shopping mall on the reserve. Opaskwayak has two hockey teams: OCN Blizzard (junior A) and OCN Storm (junior B).

OCN has made many other developments, including a community centre known as the 'Veteran's Hall', for events like bingos, socials, and community events, etc. The local hotel, known as Kikiwak Inn, was built and completed in July 1996. The Otineka Shopping Mall was built in the early 1970s and opened in the 1975 which has various retail outlets. The McGillivary Care Home was constructed in 1982 for community elders.

The community of Opaskwayak Cree Nation has two churches on the reserve. The Church of Redeemer is situated in Big Eddy, Manitoba, and the Church of Messiah is situated in the townsite area. Both of these churches have been recently constructed to replace the old churches.

Education 
In terms of education on-reserve, OCN houses the Hilda Young Child Care Centre, Joe A. Ross School, and Oscar Lathlin Collegiate. The band government also supports post-secondary students at various institutions throughout Canada and the United States.

In January 2023, Opaskwayak, along with the federal and provincial governments, announced the construction of a new apartment block in downtown Winnipeg which will be owned and operated by OCN. OCN intends to lease several of the units to First Nations students, though the apartment will be open to other applicants as well.

The building will be 7-stories tall and is located next to the University of Winnipeg's Axworthy Health & RecPlex. Built by Paragon Design Build and Bockstael Construction, the apartment's construction is expected to take 18 months and be done by summer 2024.

The combined funding will equal a $17.4 million investment, with contributions from Opaskwayak, the Government of Manitoba through Efficiency Manitoba, and the Government of Canada through the Canada Mortgage and Housing Corporation.

Government
The Band is governed by the Chief and eight Councillors, who are elected according to its own election code which was adopted by its members in 2012, for a three-year term.

The reserve consists of 24 parcels of land varying in size from 10 to 5200 acres and totaling about 45,000 acres. The most populated settlements are located in and around The Pas. Most of the reserve's borders are with the Rural Municipality of Kelsey and The Pas. The balance is with the unorganized portion of Census Division No. 21.

Notable people
Wilfred Buck, educator
Amanda Lathlin, politician
Oscar Lathlin, politician
Greg Younging, writer

See also

 OCN Storm
 OCN Blizzard

References

External links

Swampy Cree Tribal Council
Cree governments
First Nations governments in Manitoba